Sidkeong Namgyal (Wylie: srid skyong rnam rgyal) (1819–1874) was king of Sikkim from 1863 to 1874. He was son of Tsugphud Namgyal and was succeeded by his half-brother Thutob Namgyal.

His mother was the second wife of his father, a Tibetan lady, sister of the Tashi Lama.

References

External links

1819 births
1874 deaths
Monarchs of Sikkim